Papua New Guinea competed at the 2000 Summer Paralympics in Sydney.

The country's representatives were Kupuni Lewa in weightlifting, Ben Thoedore (who is visually impaired) in the men's javelin, and Dona Ou (also visually impaired) in the men's 1500m race in athletics.

Lewa lifted 125 kg in the men's 56 kg division.

See also
2000 Summer Paralympics
Papua New Guinea at the Paralympics
Papua New Guinea at the 2000 Summer Olympics

External links
International Paralympic Committee

References

Nations at the 2000 Summer Paralympics
2000
Paralympics